José Anthony Gallardo Flores (born 15 February 2001) is a Peruvian footballer who plays as a right winger for Unión Comercio.

Career

Club career
Gallardo was born in Chiclayo but moved to Lima at the age of five. When he was 11 years old, he joined Alianza Lima. He started training with the first time in the beginning of 2019 and on 12 May 2019, he got his official debut for Alianza against FBC Melgar. Gallardo started on the bench, but replaced Mauricio Matzuda after 73 minutes. Gallardo was noted for an assist to the winning goal in the last minute.

Gallardo did only play 63 minutes of three matches and for that reason, he was loaned out in January 2020 to fellow Peruvian Primera División side Carlos A. Mannucci for the whole year. Gallardo was left without contract at the end of 2021.

In March 2022, Gallardo joined Unión Comercio.

References

External links
 

Living people
2001 births
Association football wingers
Association football defenders
Peruvian footballers
Peruvian Primera División players
Club Alianza Lima footballers
Carlos A. Mannucci players
Unión Comercio footballers
People from Lima